This is a list of episodes from the Nickelodeon animated TV series, Team Umizoomi. Episodes are listed by season and airdate.

Series overview

Episodes

Season 1 (2010)
Madeleine Rose Yen replaces Sophia Fox in the role of Milli as of "The Butterfly Dance Show".

Season 2 (2010–2011)

Season 3 (2011–2012)

Season 4 (2013–2015)
Juan Mirt replaces Ethan Kempner in the role of Geo.

References

External links
 team-umizoomi.com, all about Team Umizoomi

Team Umizoomi
Team Umizoomi